Nils Hallberg (18 September 1921 – 8 October 2010) was a Swedish actor. He appeared in 90 films between 1934 and 1974.

Selected filmography

 Andersson's Kalle (1934)
 The Boys of Number Fifty Seven (1935)
 The Lady Becomes a Maid (1936)
 The Girls of Uppakra (1936)
 Poor Millionaires (1936)
 Happy Vestköping (1937)
 We at Solglantan (1939)
 In Darkest Smaland (1943)
 Imprisoned Women (1943)
 My People Are Not Yours (1944)
 We Need Each Other (1944)
 The People of Hemsö (1944)
 The Girls in Smaland (1945)
 Harald the Stalwart (1946)
 Brita in the Merchant's House (1946)
 Two Women (1947)
 Dynamite (1947)
 The People of Simlang Valley (1947)
 Maria (1947)
 Port of Call (1948)
 Private Bom (1948)
 Robinson in Roslagen (1948)
 Foreign Harbour (1948)
 Sunshine (1948)
 The Street (1949)
 Son of the Sea (1949)
 Two Stories Up (1950)
 One Summer of Happiness (1951)
 Customs Officer Bom (1951)
 In the Arms of the Sea (1951)
 For the Sake of My Intemperate Youth (1952)
 The Clang of the Pick (1952)
 Bom the Flyer (1952)
 Bread of Love (1953)
 The Beat of Wings in the Night (1953)
 Café Lunchrasten (1954)
 Storm Over Tjurö (1954)
 Enchanted Walk (1954)
 Time of Desire (1954)
 Young Summer (1954)
 Salka Valka (1954)
 A Night at Glimmingehus (1954)
 Men in the Dark (1955)
 The People of Hemsö (1955)
 A Little Nest (1956)
 Night Child (1956)
 Mother Takes a Vacation (1957)
 Bill Bergson Lives Dangerously (1957)
 The Lady in Black (1958)
 We at Väddö (1958)
 Rider in Blue (1959)
 Summer and Sinners (1960)
 The Lady in White (1962)
 Ticket to Paradise (1962)
 Sailors (1964)
 Här kommer bärsärkarna (1965)

External links

Obituary - Aftonbladet (Swedish)

1921 births
2010 deaths
Swedish male film actors
Male actors from Stockholm
20th-century Swedish male actors